Victor-A.-Huard Ecological Reserve is an ecological reserve in Quebec, Canada. It was established May 30, 1990.

External links
 Official website from Government of Québec

References

Nature reserves in Quebec
Protected areas established in 1990
Protected areas of Saguenay–Lac-Saint-Jean
1990 establishments in Quebec